The 962nd Airborne Air Control Squadron, sometimes written as 962d Airborne Air Control Squadron, is part of the 3rd Wing at Joint Base Elmendorf-Richardson, Alaska. It operates the Boeing E-3G Sentry aircraft conducting airborne battle management command and control missions. The squadron's first predecessor was the 862nd Bombardment Squadron, a heavy bomber unit that saw combat during World War II in the European Theater of Operations, where it participated in the strategic bombing campaign against Germany.  Toward the end of the war, the squadron operated fighter aircraft, acting as a scouting force for bomber formations. After V-E Day, the squadron returned the United States and was inactivated. 

The second predecessor of the squadron was activated at Otis Air Force Base, Massachusetts as the 962nd Airborne Early Warning and Control Squadron in 1955. It performed surveillance and warning missions off the Atlantic coast until inactivating in 1969. The two squadrons were consolidated into a single unit in 1985. The consolidated squadron was activated in Alaska the following year and has provided surveillance, detection and control of airpower since then.

Mission
The 962nd Airborne Air Control Squadron provides United States Indo-Pacific Command with long-range airborne surveillance, detection, identification, and command and control aircraft for both regional and deployed operations. It also supports North American Aerospace Defense Command's air defense of its Alaska NORAD Region.

History

World War II

Initial activation and training in the United States

The squadron's first predecessor, the 862th Bombardment Squadron, was first activated at McCook Army Air Field, Nebraska as one of the original four squadrons of the 493d Bombardment Group.  The formation of the squadron was delayed by an administrative error that caused some of the unit's cadre to report to Davis-Monthan Field, Arizona instead of McCook.  It was not until January 1944 that all personnel were at McCook.  By this time, the squadron had transferred on paper to  Elveden Hall, England.  The ground personnel of the squadron in the United States had been used to form Boeing B-29 Superfortress units being activated by Second Air Force, while the air echelon remained in Nebraska to conduct training on their assigned Consolidated B-24 Liberators.  Meanwhile, Eighth Air Force formed a new ground echelon for the squadron in England from other units assigned to the 3d Bombardment Division.  This ground echelon moved to the squadron's combat station, RAF Debach, in April 1944.  The squadron's air echelon departed for England via the northern ferry route on 1 May, while a small ground component left McCook and sailed from Boston, Massachusetts on the SS Brazil on 12 May 1944.

Combat in Europe

The squadron flew its first combat mission on D-Day, 6 June 1944.  It continued to fly Liberators until 24 August 1944, when it was withdrawn from combat to convert to Boeing B-17 Flying Fortresses, along with other units of the 93d Bombardment Wing, as Eighth Air Force concentrated all its Liberators in the 2d Bombardment Division.  It resumed combat missions with the B-17 on 8 September 1944.  The squadron concentrated its attacks on military and industrial targets in Germany, attacking an ordnance depot in Magdeburg, factories near Frankfurt, and a synthetic oil manufacturing plant at Merseburg.  It also attacked lines of communications, including a railroad tunnel at Ahrweiler, bridges at Irlich, and marshalling yards near Cologne.

The squadron was occasionally diverted from the strategic bombing campaign to attack tactical targets.  It supported Operation Overlord, the Normandy invasion, striking artillery batteries, airfields and bridges.  It struck enemy ground forces south of Caen and during Operation Cobra, the breakout at St Lo.  It bombed German fortifications to support Operation Market Garden, airborne attacks attempting to secure a bridgehead across the Rhine in the Netherlands, and attacked communications during the Battle of the Bulge.  Toward the end of the war, it also supported Operation Varsity, the airborne assault across the Rhine in Germany.

On 1 February 1945, the squadron designation replaced the 3d Scouting Force and moved to RAF Wormingford, while the squadron's personnel were distributed among the other squadrons of the 493d Group. The scouting forces had been established in each division of VIII Bomber Command to precede bomber formations and warn of adverse weather or enemy opposition. The force was equipped with North American P-51 Mustangs flown by experienced bomber pilots, while wingmen were fighter pilots. After hostilities and the need for a scouting force ended, the squadron was reformed at Debach in the 493d Group in May. The squadron flew food-dropping missions in early May. In late August, the squadron assembled at Sioux Falls Army Air Field, South Dakota, where it was inactivated on 28 August 1945.

Airborne warning and control

Air Defense of the Atlantic coast

The second predecessor of the unit, the 962d Airborne Early Warning and Control Squadron, was activated at Otis Air Force Base, Massachusetts on 8 July 1955.  The squadron's primary tactical aircraft was the Lockheed EC-121 Warning Star, although it flew other models of the Constellation as well.  At Otis, it was assigned to the 551st Airborne Early Warning and Control Wing of Air Defense Command (ADC).  The squadron mission was to extend ADC's early warning system radar coverage seaward beyond that provided by ADC's land radars.  The unit also provided navigation and communications assistance to U.S. and allied aircraft crossing the Atlantic Ocean and conducted search and rescue operations.  The 962d was inactivated on 31 December 1969.

Alaskan operations
The 962d was consolidated with the 862d Bombardment Squadron as the 962d Airborne Warning and Control Squadron while inactive in 1985.  The consolidated unit was activated on 8 July 1986, at Elmendorf Air Force Base.  The 962d was assigned to the 28th Air Division at Tinker Air Force Base, Oklahoma, which controlled all Boeing E-3 Sentry aircraft.  The mission of the 962d was to provide the Eleventh Air Force commander (who also commanded the Alaska NORAD Region) with a survivable radar platform to extend the surveillance coverage of land-based radars operated by the Alaskan Regional Operational Control Center.  The squadron's airborne radars could detect threats at ranges outside the ground-based radar coverage areas to position interceptors to intercept them before they enter U.S. airspace.  Between 1986 and 2007, the squadron assisted in the interception of 68 Soviet Air Force aircraft.

In May 1992, the 28th Air Division was inactivated and the squadron was briefly assigned to the 552nd Operations Group.  This assignment was brief, since the Air Force had decided that units on a base should all be assigned to one wing under what was named the Objective Wing organization,  In October 1992, the squadron was reassigned to the 3d Operations Group of Elmendorf's host 3d Wing at Elmendorf.  It also acquired the mission of being ready to deploy in support of United States Pacific Command.  In August 1994, the 962d was redesignated the 962d Airborne Air Control Squadron.

On 22 September 1995, the squadron experienced its worst single accident. Aircraft YUKLA 27 rolled for takeoff at 0746 Alaska Standard Time, remaining airborne only 42 seconds due to a massive birdstrike resulting in catastrophic engine damage. The crash resulted in the deaths of 22 U.S. Air Force and two Royal Canadian Air Force personnel. Today, squadron aircrews take part in exercises such as RED FLAG-ALASKA, NORTHERN EDGE, COPE NORTH, and TALISMAN SABRE to remain prepared for contingency operations in the Pacific, while also maintaining a continuous alert presence for the homeland defense mission.

Lineage
 862d Bombardment Squadron
 Constituted as the 862d Bombardment Squadron (Heavy) on 14 September 1943
 Activated on 1 November 1943
 Redesignated 862d Bombardment Squadron, Heavy on 21 February 1944
 Inactivated on 28 Aug 1945
 Consolidated with the 962d Airborne Warning and Control Support Squadron as the 962d Airborne Warning and Control Squadron on 19 September 1985

 962d Airborne Air Control Squadron
 Constituted as the 962d Airborne Early Warning and Control Squadron on 30 March 1955
 Activated on 8 July 1955
 Inactivated on 31 December 1969
 Redesignated 962d Airborne Warning and Control Support Squadron on 31 July 1979
 Consolidated with the 862d Bombardment Squadron as the 962d Airborne Warning and Control Squadron on 19 September 1985
 Activated on 1 July 1986
 Redesignated 962d Airborne Air Control Squadron on 1 August 1994

Assignments
 493d Bombardment Group, 1 November 1943 – 28 August 1945 (attached to 3rd Air Division, 17 February–7 May 1945)
 551st Airborne Early Warning and Control Wing, 8 July 1955 – 31 December 1969
 28th Air Division, 1 July 1986
 552nd Operations Group, 29 May 1992
 3rd Operations Group, 1 May 1993 – present

Stations
 McCook Army Air Field, Nebraska, 1 November 1943 – 1 January 1944
 Elveden Hall (Station 116), England, 1 January 1944
 RAF Debach (Station 152), England, 17 April 1944 – 6 August 1945
 RAF Wormingford (Station 159), England, 17 February 1945
 RAF Debach (Station 152), England, 18 May–6 August 1945
 Sioux Falls Army Air Field, South Dakota, c. 13–28 Aug 1945
 Otis Air Force Base, Massachusetts, 8 July 1955 – 31 December 1969
 Elmendorf Air Force Base, Alaska, 1 July 1986 – present

Aircraft

 Consolidated B-24 Liberator (1944)
 Boeing B-17 Flying Fortress (1944–1945)
 North American P-51 Mustang (1945)
 Lockheed C-121 Constellation (1955–1969)
 Lockheed EC-121 Warning Star (1955–1969)
 Lockheed RC-121 Warning Star (1955–1969)
 Boeing E-3 Sentry (1986–Present)

References

Notes
 Explanatory notes

 Citations

Bibliography

 
 
 
 
 
 

Military units and formations in Alaska
962
1955 establishments in Alaska